London Buses route 507 is a Transport for London contracted bus route in London, England. Running between Waterloo and Victoria stations, it is operated by London General. It is also one of two Red Arrow branded services. In 2016, it became the first battery electric bus route in London, along with route 521.

History 

Red Arrow route 507 commenced operating on 7 September 1968 as part of the Red Arrow  network of flat fare bus routes aimed at commuters in Central London linking some of the capital's main railway termini.

On 2 June 2002, along with route 521, the route was the first bus route in London to be converted to articulated bus with Mercedes-Benz O530G Citaros.

During late 2003, early 2004, a series of onboard fires on Mercedes-Benz O530Gs led to withdrawal of the entire fleet, while Mercedes-Benz made some modifications. During this period limited services operated using a variety of different buses on route 507, including double-deckers.

On 25 July 2009, as part of the move to replace London's articulated buses, the O530Gs were replaced by Mercedes-Benz O530 Citaros.

Another criticism of articulated buses was the low number of seats, with only 49 per vehicle. A standard rigid Citaro has 44 seats, however the new ones for route 507 have just 21, with room supposedly for up to 76 standees, leading to criticism the new buses were "cattle trucks" and even more crowded than the buses they replaced.

In December 2013, two trial BYD electric buses were introduced. In September 2016, Alexander Dennis Enviro 200 bodied BYD electric buses began to operate the route, making it and route 521 the first battery electric bus routes in London. In September 2016, the buses on this route and the 521 received new digital route displays.

In 2021, the peak time frequency was reduced from 18 buses per hour to 7.5.

Future withdrawal 
On 23 November 2022, it was announced that route 507 would be withdrawn following a consultation, with route 11 being rerouted to compensate for its loss. These changes will be implemented by the end of 2023.

Current route 
Route 507 operates via these primary locations:
Waterloo station Cab Road  
County Hall
St Thomas' Hospital
Lambeth Palace
Lambeth Bridge
Millbank
Westminster Cathedral
Victoria bus station  for Victoria station

References

External links 

Timetable

Bus routes in London
Transport in the London Borough of Lambeth
Transport in the City of Westminster